Wytze Kooistra (born 3 June 1982) is a Dutch volleyball player, a member of Netherlands men's national volleyball team and Dutch club Abiant Lycurgus Groningen.

Career
He began his career as a middle-blocker. In 2013, he played for his national team as a spiker, and now he is playing in this position at his club.

Clubs
His first professional club was Lycurgus. During the seasons 2002-2005, he played for Piet Zoomers. In 2005, he moved to Itas Diatec Trentino. In 2011, he moved to Polish PlusLiga team, PGE Skra Bełchatów. For a long time he was a reserve player. With the club from Bełchatów, Kooistra won the Polish Cup of 2012, a silver medal in the Polish Championship in the season 2011/2012 and in the Polish SuperCup of 2013. He is a silver medalist of the CEV Champions League, which was held in Łódź, Poland. In 2013 moved to another Polish PlusLiga club - Cerrad Czarni Radom.

Sporting achievements

Clubs

CEV Champions League
  2011/2012 - with PGE Skra Bełchatów

CEV Cup
  2007/2008, with M. Roma Volley

FIVB Club World Championship
  Qatar 2012 - with PGE Skra Bełchatów

National championships
 2011/2012  Polish Championship, with PGE Skra Bełchatów
 2011/2012  Polish Cup, with PGE Skra Bełchatów
 2012/2013  Polish SuperCup, with PGE Skra Bełchatów
 2014/2015  Greek League Cup, with Olympiacos

Individually
 2005 Dutch Championship - Best Blocker

References

External links
 FIVB profile
 PlusLiga player profile

Living people
1982 births
Sportspeople from Drenthe
Dutch men's volleyball players
Dutch expatriate sportspeople in Poland
Expatriate volleyball players in Poland
Olympiacos S.C. players
Skra Bełchatów players
Czarni Radom players
Expatriate volleyball players in Greece
Dutch expatriate sportspeople in Greece
Dutch expatriate sportspeople in Italy
Expatriate volleyball players in Italy
People from Midden-Drenthe